Nergal is a Mesopotamian deity.

Nergal may also refer to:

Books and comics
 Nergal, a demon in the comic book series Hellblazer
 Nergal, the antagonist in Ed Greenwood's novel Elminster in Hell
 Nergal, a battleship in David Weber's Mutineers' Moon

Games 
 Nergal (Dungeons & Dragons), a devil in Dungeons & Dragons
 Nergal (Fire Emblem), the main villain in Fire Emblem: Rekka no Ken
 Nergal, one of the founding members of the Baali bloodline in the role-playing game Vampire: The Masquerade
 Nergal, an antagonist in the video game Bishōjo Senshi Sailor Moon: Another Story

Television 
 Nergal, a monster and recurring from the animated series The Grim Adventures of Billy and Mandy, or his son (Nergal Jr.)
 Nergal Heavy Industries, a company in the anime Martian Successor Nadesico

Other uses 
 Adam Nergal Darski (born Adam Michał Darski, 1977), vocalist and guitarist of the Polish band Behemoth
 Nergal (crater), a crater on Jupiter's moon Ganymede

See also 
 Nirgal, a character in Kim Stanley Robinson's Mars trilogy
 Nurgle, a god in the Warhammer fictional universe